Correa Point is a point projecting 350 m into the south part of Discovery Bay from Parvomay Neck, Greenwich Island in the South Shetland Islands, Antarctica with an adjacent ice-free area of .  The point forms the southwest side of the entrance to Rodríguez Cove and the southeast side of the entrance to Ramos Cove.

The feature was named by the 1947 Chilean Antarctic Expedition after Hernán Correa, cameraman for the state Directorate of Culture Information (Dirección de Información de Cultura) with the expedition; a 65 m rocky hill rising 350 m south of the point was named Picacho D.I.C. after the Directorate.

Location

Maps
 L.L. Ivanov et al. Antarctica: Livingston Island and Greenwich Island, South Shetland Islands. Scale 1:100000 topographic map. Sofia: Antarctic Place-names Commission of Bulgaria, 2005.

Notes

References
 SCAR Composite Antarctic Gazetteer.

Headlands of Greenwich Island